The 1986 Akron Zips football team represented Akron University in the 1986 NCAA Division I-AA football season as members of the Ohio Valley Conference. They were led by first-year head coach Gerry Faust. The Zips played their home games at the Rubber Bowl in Akron, Ohio. They finished the season with a record of 7–4 overall and 4–3 in OVC play to tie for third place.

Schedule

References

Akron
Akron Zips football seasons
Akron Zips football